Mineral Hills was a village in southeastern Iron River Township, Iron County, in the U.S. state of Michigan.  In the 2000 census, the village population was 214.

Effective July 1, 2000, the village of Mineral Hills and the city of Stambaugh were consolidated with the city of Iron River.

Geography
According to the United States Census Bureau, the village has a total area of 3.8 km2 (1.5 mi2), all land.

Demographics
As of the census of 2000, there were 214 people, 90 households, and 57 families residing in the village.  The population density was 57.0/km2 (147.6/mi2).  There were 95 housing units at an average density of 25.3/km2 (65.5/mi2).  The racial makeup of the village was 96.73% White, 0.47% Native American, 0.47% from other races, and 2.34% from two or more races. Hispanic or Latino of any race were 0.47% of the population.

There were 90 households, out of which 33.3% had children under the age of 18 living with them, 46.7% were married couples living together, 11.1% had a female householder with no husband present, and 35.6% were non-families. 34.4% of all households were made up of individuals, and 18.9% had someone living alone who was 65 years of age or older.  The average household size was 2.38 and the average family size was 2.95.

In the village, the population was spread out, with 26.2% under the age of 18, 8.9% from 18 to 24, 29.0% from 25 to 44, 20.1% from 45 to 64, and 15.9% who were 65 years of age or older.  The median age was 36 years. For every 100 females, there were 107.8 males.  For every 100 females age 18 and over, there were 97.5 males.

The median income for a household in the village was $30,750, and the median income for a family was $33,472. Males had a median income of $30,000 versus $16,667 for females. The per capita income for the village was $12,486.  About 17.0% of families and 13.6% of the population were below the poverty line, including 20.0% of those under the age of eighteen and none of those 65 or over.

References

Geography of Iron County, Michigan
Populated places disestablished in 2000
Former villages in Michigan